After Dark is the third and final studio album by English singer-songwriter Andy Gibb. It features his last US Top 10 single "Desire", "I Can't Help It" (a duet with Olivia Newton-John) and two Bee Gees numbers "Rest Your Love on Me" (also a duet with Olivia Newton-John) and "Warm Ride".

Although the album is not currently in print, it was released to music streaming platforms along with the other two Andy Gibb albums in 2011.

Overview
Around the same time when Barry Gibb was co-writing and recording demos for Barbra Streisand as a guideline to her (the songs are, in Streisand's version, released on Guilty), as drugs impeding his previous ability to write and even fully sing the tracks on his own record, Andy was only able to forge his performance with nearly intrusive support from Barry as he began writing songs for Andy to sing and to include on his next album.

Recording
The album was recorded in May, continuing in October and finishing in November 1979 at the Criteria Studios. "Desire" was originally a Bee Gees song that was recorded in 1978 on the sessions of Spirits Having Flown with Barry on lead vocals but was later dropped on the album. Andy's version was recorded on 30 May 1979. Related songs that were not released from the sessions include, "Warm", "Back to the Wind" (both written by Andy), and "For You" (written by Barry). Andy and Olivia Newton-John had previously performed "Rest Your Love on Me" on a UNICEF show in January that year, and later she agreed to record it in the studio as part of the album track on this album. His rendition of "Warm Ride" by the Bee Gees which was an outtake from Saturday Night Fever sessions was also included on this LP. Years later, co-producer Albhy Galuten said of it, "I don't know how that got on there". The title track and "Wherever You Are" features Andy and Barry singing together. The ballad "Dreamin' On" closes the album.

Aside from producing this album, arranging the orchestra on some songs, played synthesizer on the album, Galuten also co-wrote "Falling in Love With You" with Barry. The album also features guitar work from famous session musician Hugh McCracken as well as The Brecker Brothers, Randy and Michael.

Critical reception

In March 1980 the last of Gibb's Top Ten singles charted just ahead of the album's release, "Desire".  A second single, "I Can't Help It", a duet with family friend Olivia Newton-John, reached the Top Twenty. Unlike the Bee Gees version of "Warm Ride", Andy's version was recorded in slower tempo and was not sung in falsetto.

The album's disappointing performance, coupled with Gibb's mounting drug problems, would lead to RSO Records dropping Gibb from its roster. On VH1's Behind the Music, label founder Robert Stigwood said that he was heartbroken at having to make the decision to drop Gibb, but that his behaviour gave him very little choice.

It was his final full studio album; his first compilation Andy Gibb's Greatest Hits was released in September 1980 with three new songs. In 1981, he later performed on Canadian band Flower's "Here Inside", releasing his last single "All I Have to Do Is Dream", a duet with his partner at that time, actress Victoria Principal. Around the same time as the song was recorded, he attempted to record "Will You Love Me Tomorrow" again.

Track listing

Personnel 
 Andy Gibb – lead vocals
 George Bitzer – keyboards, synthesizers 
 Albhy Galuten – keyboards, string arrangements and conductor 
 Blue Weaver – keyboards 
 Barry Gibb – synthesizers, guitars, string arrangements, backing vocals, lead vocals on some lines 
 Hugh McCracken – guitars
 Joey Murcia – guitars
 Tim Renwick – guitars
 George Terry – guitars
 Harold Cowart – bass
 Ron Ziegler – drums 
 Dennis Bryon – drums 
 Joe Lala – percussion
 Tom Roady – percussion
 Michael Brecker – saxophones (1)
 Dan Bonsanti – saxophones, woodwinds
 Neal Bonsanti – saxophones, woodwinds
 Whit Sidener – saxophones, woodwinds
 Peter Graves – trombone
 Randy Brecker – trumpet (1)
 Ken Faulk – trumpet 
 Bill Purse – trumpet
 Gene Orloff – string contractor
 Charlie Chalmers – backing vocals
 Donna Rhodes – backing vocals
 Sandy Rhodes – backing vocals
 Maurice Gibb – backing vocals (2)
 Robin Gibb – backing vocals (2)
 Olivia Newton-John – lead vocals (5, 6)

Production 
 Albhy Galuten – producer 
 Barry Gibb – producer 
 Karl Richardson – producer, engineer
 Dennis Hetzendorfer – assistant engineer
 Mike Fuller – mastering 
 Ed Caraeff – art direction, design, photography 
 Arthur Johns – hair stylist

Charts

Weekly charts

Year-end charts

Certifications

References 

1980 albums
Andy Gibb albums
Albums produced by Barry Gibb
Albums arranged by Barry Gibb
RSO Records albums